Gaumont may refer to:

Gaumont (surname)
Gaumont River, France, alias at Lafage-sur-Sombre

Companies
 Gaumont Film Company (founded 1895), a French company in film production and distribution
 Gaumont International Television, an American television division of the above
 Gaumont-British (independent 1922), a former film production company, active during 1898-1938
 Gaumont Buena Vista International, a joint film distribution of Gaumont and Buena Vista International

Live performance and theatre venues
 Gaumont Cinema, a former theatre in Southend, UK, built by Bertie Crewe
 Gaumont Haymarket, a cinema in London, UK 1937–1959
 Gaumont State Cinema, an Art Deco theatre in Kilburn district, London, UK
 Gaumont-Palace, a cinema in Paris open from 1907 to 1973
 , a cinema in Buenos Aires
 Bradford Odeon, formerly the Gaumont, a theatre in Bradford, UK
 Hammersmith Apollo, formerely the Gaumont Palace, a performance venue in London 
 Mayflower Theatre, formerly the Gaumont Theatre, a theatre in Southampton, United Kingdom
 Regent Theatre, formerly the Gaumont Theatre, a theatre and concert venue located in Ipswich, Suffolk, England